Nordvestnytt (Northwest News) is a local Norwegian newspaper published once a week in Smøla in Møre og Romsdal county. 

Nordvestnytt was founded in 1988. The paper covers news and events in the municipalities of Smøla and Aure. The paper is edited by Ivar Torset.

Circulation
According to the Norwegian Audit Bureau of Circulations and National Association of Local Newspapers, Nordvestnytt has had the following annual circulation:
2004: 2,063
2005: 2,000
2006: 1,970
2007: 1,911
2008: 1,806
2009: 1,707
2010: 1,576
2011: 1,605
2012: 1,573
2013: 1,581
2014: 1,768
2015: 1,524
2016: 1,556

References

External links
Nordvestnytt home page

Newspapers published in Norway
Norwegian-language newspapers
Smøla
Mass media in Møre og Romsdal
Publications established in 1988
1988 establishments in Norway